Narciso Valentin Ticobay (19 March 1932 – 21 July 2013) was a Filipino Episcopalian bishop. He was the second Prime Bishop of the Episcopal Church in the Philippines from 1993 to 1997. He also served as the second Diocesan Bishop the EDSP from 1986 to 1993. He died in 2013 at the age of 81.

References

External links
ECP Elects New Prime Bishop, The Episcopal Diocese of Northern Central Philippines Official Website
Bishop Protests at Tutu's Inclusion on List of 'Troublemakers'
Memorial website

1932 births
2013 deaths
Filipino Episcopalians
Filipino bishops
Anglican bishops in the Philippines
Prime bishops of the Episcopal Church in the Philippines
Episcopal bishops of Southern Philippines
20th-century Anglican bishops in Asia